The year 1960 was the 179th year of the Rattanakosin Kingdom of Thailand. It was the 15th year in the reign of King Bhumibol Adulyadej (Rama IX), and is reckoned as year 2503 in the Buddhist Era.

Incumbents
King: Bhumibol Adulyadej 
Crown Prince: (vacant)
Prime Minister: Sarit Thanarat 
Supreme Patriarch: 
starting 4 May: Ariyavongsagatanana III

Events

January

February

March

April

May

June
 14 June - 14 July - 33 years after his birth in Cambridge, His Majesty King Bhumibol Adulyadej made the first of two return visits to the United States. And the rest of the Royal Family heads for a state visit.

July

August

September

October

November

December

Births

Deaths

See also
 List of Thai films of 1960
 1960 in Thai television

References

External links

 
Years of the 20th century in Thailand
Thailand
Thailand
1960s in Thailand